Khramtsov (Russian: Храмцов) is a Russian masculine surname, its feminine counterpart is Khramtsova. The surname may refer to the following notable people:
Dmitrii Khramtsov (born 1999), Russian slalom canoeist 
Maksim Khramtsov (born 1998), Russian taekwondo practitioner
Oleksiy Khramtsov (born 1975), Ukrainian football defender 
Sergei Khramtsov (born 1977), Russian football player

Russian-language surnames